A Child's Good Night Book is a 1943 picture book by Margaret Wise Brown and illustrated by Jean Charlot. Children and animals settle down for the night. The book was a recipient of a 1944 Caldecott Honor for its illustrations.

References

1943 children's books
American picture books
Caldecott Honor-winning works